Rajesh Babu, better known as Satyam Rajesh, is an Indian actor who primarily appears in Telugu films. He has worked in more than 350 films.  Rajesh got the moniker Satyam following his appearance in the 2003 film of the same name.

Early life 
Rajesh was born in Visakhapatnam as Rajesh Babu. His father is a retired telecom employee and his mother is a homemaker. He studied MBA and worked in Mahindra. He got transferred to Hyderabad as a part of his job, which is when he sought opportunities for acting in Telugu films.

Filmography

Television 

 3 Roses (2021) on Aha
 Maa uri polimera (2021) on hotstar

References

External links
 

Telugu comedians
Telugu male actors
Place of birth missing (living people)
Living people
1979 births
Male actors from Andhra Pradesh
Male actors in Telugu cinema